Irene Aurelia Tarimo (born 1 October 1964) is a Tanzanian environmental scientist and educator. She currently serves as Head of Department of environmental studies at the Open University of Tanzania (OUT), where she is also a lecturer and a researcher. She previously served as OUT Director in the Lindi Region since 2007 to 2015.

Academic degrees and honours
In 1983, she obtained a diploma in biology, chemistry and education from the Dar es Salaam Teachers College, now Dar es Salaam University College of Education. In 2003, she was awarded Bachelor's degree of Science in education (honors) form the Open University of Tanzania, then in 2007 Master of Science in environmental science (thesis) from University of Dar es Salaam and Doctor of Science in environmental pollution control and ecological modelling from Open University of Tanzania sandwich with Copenhagen University. In 2011, she was a visiting scholar at the University of Montana. In 2019, she received a certificate from Centre for Foreign Relations.

Selected works

See also

References

External links

 
 
 ORCID Researcher id

1964 births
Living people
Tanzanian women
Tanzanian educators
Tanzanian scientists
Tanzanian women scientists
Tanzanian civil servants
People from Kilimanjaro Region
University of Dar es Salaam alumni
Open University of Tanzania alumni
Weruweru Secondary School alumni
University of Copenhagen alumni
Systems ecologists
21st-century women scientists
21st-century women educators
21st-century Tanzanian people